Kamara may refer to:

Places
 Lato pros Kamara or simply Kamara, an ancient city on Crete
 Kamara, Estonia, a village
 Kämara, Estonia, a village
 Kamara, Arcadia, Greece, a village
 Kamara, Corfu, Greece, a village in the municipal unit Achilleio
 The Arch of Galerius in Thessaloniki, popularly known as Kamara
Kamara Chiefdom in Kono District of Sierra Leone
Ait Kamara, a village in Morocco

Other
Kamara (given name)
Kamara (surname)
Kamara language of Ghana
Lambri Kamara, a form of a Greek folk dance
Kamara name of the first Gombe local Government education secretary Mamman Kamara

See also
 Camara (disambiguation)
 Câmara (disambiguation)
 Kamaras
 Kamares (disambiguation)

Surnames of African origin Eg Gombe Local government education secretary Mamman Kamara